Austrian car number plates are mandatory vehicle registration plates displaying the registration mark of motor vehicles in Austria. They are used to verify street legality, proof of a valid liability insurance and to identify and recognise the vehicle.

Appearance 

The licence plates are made of metal; the imprinted text is in black letters and digits on a white background. Since November 1, 2002 the common design comprises a blue section on the left with the EU circle of stars and the country code ('A') like other vehicle registration plates of the European Union. On the top and bottom, there are red-white-red tribands, the national colours of Austria. Two plates have to be present on each car (front and rear). Dealer plates show white letters on a green background, temporary plates show white letters on a cyan background, and foreign trailers show white letters on a red background.
For motorbikes and cars with smaller areas for plates, smaller licence plates are available with two lines of text. Moped plates are in different appearance and shape, they show white letters on a red background.

Lettering system 

The alphanumeric format for registration plates is "XX ∇=provincial emblem number+letter(s)" or "XX ∇=provincial emblem personalised letters+number";
 XX - one or two letters which indicate the local registration office (district where the registered possessor resides). As a general rule, State capitals have one letter; other districts have two letters.
 the coat of arms of the Austrian state the district belongs to (here shown as "∇"); diplomatic vehicles have a dash (–) instead, federal official vehicles wear the Austrian Federal Eagle.
 A three to six-letter/number sequence which uniquely distinguishes each of the vehicles displaying the same initial area code. The letter Q is excluded from all sequences.

There are several lettering schemes:
The letter/number sequence must contain at least three characters (at least one digit and one letter). In countryside districts, the maximum is five characters. Regular plates start with a digit and end with a letter. Personalized plates, which can be obtained by paying an extra fee, are ordered vice versa. (exceptions: see below)
The letter/number sequence of state capitals contains up to six characters (at least one digit one letter with a minimum of four characters) (e.g. W ∇ 12345 A).
Until the year 2000 the plates were issued by the district administrations, who used a variety of lettering schemes, e.g. one digit and three letters (e.g. FK ∇ 1 ABC in the Feldkirch district), two digits and two letters (e.g. WL ∇ 12 AB in the Wels-Land district) or three digits and one letter.
Since 2000 the vehicle registration have been carried out by car insurance companies on behalf of the government. The branch offices of these companies issue the plates, which show three digits and two letters (e.g. XX ∇ 123 AB) in each district or four digits and two letters in state capitals respectively.

Army, diplomats, police etc. have a number up to five digits only (starting with 1, incrementing)
 There are standardized abbreviations for special types of cars. But most of them are in use in Vienna only:
BB Bundesbahnen (Federal Railways), only with Index  "W", e.g. W ∇ 1234 BB
BE Bestattung (funeral services)
EW E-Werk (electric power company)
FF Freiwillige Feuerwehr (volunteer firemen)
FW Feuerwehr (firemen)
GW Gaswerk  (gas power company)
GT Gütertransport (vehicles transporting goods)
KT Kleintransport (private vehicles transporting parcels)
LO Linienomnibus (public service buses)
LR Landesregierung (Local government of Niederösterreich)
LV Landesregierung (Local government of Tyrol)
MA Magistrat Wien (Local government of Vienna)
MW Mietwagen (private hire car or bus service [with driver])
RD Rettungsdienst (ambulance vehicles)
RK Rotes Kreuz (Red Cross)
TX Taxi (taxis)

Personalised plates 

In Austria, it is possible to obtain a customized registration plate by payment of €228.30 for registration and €21.00 for the plates themselves. The alphanumeric format is XX ∇ ABC 1, which makes them easily distinguishable from standard plates (e.g. DO ∇ BUS 3)

Electric plates 

Since 2017, electric plates have been introduced in Austria, these special plates are given only to electric vehicles and are exempt from parking charges in Vienna, Innsbruck, Klagenfurt, Wels, Linz, Graz, Mödling, Zell am See, Klosterneuburg and Krems.

Other plates

Export transit plates 

Export transit plates are vehicle plates that are issued to vehicles that are being exported, the plate is used for vehicles that need to get to their desired export destination, but aren't allowed to use regular licence plates because they have been deregistered abroad. For motor vehicles the cost of an export transit plate is €197.3. The export transit plates are valid for 3 to 21 days.

Provisional plates

Prefixes

History 

From 1906 until 1919, the plates always composed one letter followed by Roman numerals and three numbers (e.g. "BXV 639"). Temporary admission plates always followed by prefix. The prefixes are G= Bosnia and Herzegovina, U= Hungary, Z= All other countries.

From 1919 until 1930, the plates format is the same as before but became authority supplied.

From 1930 until 1939, the plates comprised one letter followed by five digits. (e.g. B 12345) The thousands of digits encoded the districts.

From 1939 until 1945, the plates comprised two letters followed by a hyphen and seven digits. (e.g. W-1234567) This followed the Nazi German system.

From 1945 until 1946, the plates comprised by a state coat of arms followed by maximum six numbers. They were only issued in the USSR-occupied zone.

From 1947 until 1989, the plates comprised one or two letters to indicate the state or federal code followed by up to six digits (e.g. W 123.456), the first number block was reserved for vehicles, the second one was the serial, when they run out of serials they began to issue XX 999.A99. The background is black with white characters for private vehicles (unknown for all other vehicles). One or two letters are the prefixes set by state and federals, they are:
B  Burgenland
BH Bundesheer (Federal Army)
G  Graz
K  Carinthia
L  Linz
N  Lower Austria
O- Upper Austria (the dash after the letter O prevents misunderstandings with the number 0)
PT Post & Telekom Austria (Federal Mail and Telekom)
S  Salzburg (state)
St Styria (the only prefix with a lower case letter)
T  Tirol
V  Vorarlberg
W  Vienna (Wien)

Diplomatic codes

References

External links
 

Transport in Austria
Austria
Austria transport-related lists
 Registration plates